Steven L. Black is a Canadian politician, who served as mayor of Timmins, Ontario from 2014 to 2018. He was elected in the municipal election on October 27, 2014, defeating former councillor Todd Lever by taking 65% of the vote, and becoming Timmins' youngest mayor ever elected. He succeeded retiring mayor Tom Laughren.

Originally from Oshawa, Ontario, he studied mining engineering at Queen's University, and moved to Timmins in 2004 to complete a co-operative education term with the city's Kidd Creek Mine. He coached minor hockey for six seasons, and has been involved with the Timmins and Schumacher minor hockey associations.

Prior to his election to the mayoralty, Black served as a city councillor on the Timmins City Council from 2010 to 2014. At the time of his election he was the second youngest councillor elected in history.  Alan Pope was a few months younger when elected as an alderman in 1973. He ran as a Progressive Conservative Party of Ontario candidate in Timmins—James Bay in the 2014 provincial election, but lost to incumbent MPP Gilles Bisson.

Black was defeated by George Pirie in the 2018 municipal election.

He ran as a Liberal Party of Canada candidate for Timmins—James Bay in the 2021 Canadian federal election, but was not victorious.

He was reelected to a council seat in the 2022 Cochrane District municipal elections.

Electoral record

Federal

Provincial

 Municipal

Ontario Mining Cup

In addition to being a volunteer minor hockey coach for the Schumacher Day Minor Hockey Association, Black was also the founder of the Ontario Mining Cup hockey tournament. The tournament seeks to bring together mining sector hockey teams from around the province to compete for industry bragging rights while raising money for post-secondary scholarships in mining.

See also

 List of the youngest mayors in Canada

References

External links
 City of Timmins: Mayor's Office

1982 births
Living people
Mayors of Timmins
People from Oshawa
Timmins city councillors
Queen's University at Kingston alumni